José Mota (born 7 September 1919) was a Portuguese footballer who played as a forward.

External links

1919 births
Year of death missing
Portuguese footballers
Association football forwards
Primeira Liga players
G.D. Estoril Praia players
Vitória S.C. players
Portugal international footballers